The 2022 Rhode Island Secretary of State election was held on November 8, 2022, to elect the next secretary of state of Rhode Island. Incumbent Democrat Nellie Gorbea was term-limited and could not seek re-election.

Democratic primary

Candidates

Nominee
Gregg Amore, state representative

Eliminated in primary
Stephanie Beauté, insurance software executive

Did not appear on ballot
Anthony N. B. Tamba, realtor

Declined
Gayle Goldin, former state senator (accepted a job in the U.S. Department of Labor)
Liz Tanner, director of the Rhode Island Department of Business Regulation (appointed Rhode Island Secretary of Commerce)

Endorsements

Results

Republican Primary

Candidates

Nominee
Pat Cortellessa, nominee for secretary of state in 2018 and for state senate in 2020

Results

General election

Predictions

Results

References

External links
Official campaign websites
Gregg Amore (D) for Secretary of State
Pat Cortellessa (R) for Secretary of State

Secretary of State
Rhode Island
Rhode Island Secretary of State elections